The Finnish Safety and Chemicals Agency, or Tukes (previously) is an agency within the Ministry of Employment and the Economy of Finland. Its task is to monitor and enforce safety and regulations compliance in technology, chemicals and hazardous materials, workplace safety and consumer and product safety. It is the Member State Competent Authority (MSCA) for the European Union REACH, CLP, BPD and SEVESO III regulations in Finland. However, food, medications and medical safety are governed by different agencies (Evira, Fimea and Valvira, respectively).

Its main divisions are:
 Facilities and mines monitoring
 Products and equipment monitoring
 Support and development services
 Chemical products monitoring

External links 
 

Safety and Chemicals Agency
Finland